Waterson, Berlin & Snyder, Inc. was, during the 1920s, one of the largest music publishers of popular sheet music in the country.  The firm was based in New York City.  What began as the Ted Snyder Company in 1908 evolved into Waterson, Berlin & Snyder, Inc., in 1917 when its founder, Ted Snyder (1881–1965), took on two partners – Henry Waterson (1873–1933) and Irving Berlin (1888–1989).  Berlin had been Ted Snyder's staff lyricist since 1909.

Tin Pan Alley publisher
"Tin Pan Alley" was a specific area in New York City on 28th Street, between Broadway and 6th Avenue that, at the turn of the 20th century, was the epicenter of the popular music publishing industry.  Many publishing firms were not actually located on that particular block, but, "Tin Pan Alley" was also as much a reference to a music industry district as it was to a music genre (popular music, ragtime – the precursor to what became jazz).  Waterson, Berlin & Snyder was a Tin Pan Alley firm.

Former addresses of Waterson, Berlin & Snyder, Inc.
 47th Street & Broadway, Strand Theatre Building, New York City

Mills Music, Inc.
Snyder left the company in 1927 to move to California.  Waterson, Berlin & Snyder went bankrupt in 1929; and, as part of the bankruptcy sale, Jack Mills, of Mills Music, Inc., purchased its catalog for $5000.

Pioneer publisher of black composers
It was rare for black composers to be involved in Tin Pan Alley, which, for Mills Music, represented a business opportunity.  Through subsidiaries (such as Milsons, Exclusive, Grand, and American Academy of Music), Mills marketed Duke Ellington to different audiences.  This strategy helped elevate Mills as major player in the music publishing business.

References

Music publishing companies of the United States
Defunct companies based in New York City
Publishing companies established in 1908
1908 establishments in New York City
Irving Berlin